Begichevo is a rural locality (a village) in Buravtsovskoye Rural Settlement, Ertilsky District, Voronezh Oblast, Russia. The population was 128 as of 2010. There are 2 streets.

Geography 
Begichevo is located 26 km southeast of Ertil (the district's administrative centre) by road. Buravtsovka is the nearest rural locality.

References 

Rural localities in Ertilsky District
Borisoglebsky Uyezd (Tambov Governorate)